The 2015–16 NCAA football bowl games were a series of college football bowl games. They completed the 2015 NCAA Division I FBS football season. The games began on December 19, 2015 and, aside from the all-star games, ended with the 2016 College Football Playoff National Championship which was played on January 11, 2016.

A new record total of 41 team-competitive bowl games were played in FBS, including the national championship game and the inaugural Cure Bowl and Arizona Bowl. While bowl games had been the purview of only the very best teams for nearly a century, this was the tenth consecutive year that teams with non-winning seasons were bowl-eligible and participated in bowl games. To fill the 80 available team-competitive bowl slots, a new record 15 teams (19% of all participants) with non-winning seasons participated in bowl games—12 had a .500 (6–6) season and, for another new record, three had a sub-.500 season. Those three teams each had 5–7 seasons, sharing a new record for the most regular season losses by a bowl team, which had previously been six. This situation led directly to the NCAA Division I Council imposing a three-year moratorium on new bowl games in April 2016.

Schedule
The schedule for the 2015–16 bowl games is below. All times are EST (UTC−5).  The rankings used were the CFP rankings.

College Football Playoff and Championship Game
The 2015–16 postseason was the second to feature a College Football Playoff (CFP) to determine a national champion of Division I FBS college football. Four teams were selected by a 12-member committee to participate in a single-elimination tournament, whose semifinals were held at the Orange Bowl and the Cotton Bowl as part of a yearly rotation of six bowls. Their winners advanced to the 2016 College Football Playoff National Championship at University of Phoenix Stadium in Glendale, Arizona on January 11, 2016.

Both semifinal bowls were held on December 31, 2015. Under the TV contracts with ESPN that predate the CFP, both the Rose Bowl and the Sugar Bowl (the first two bowls in the three cycling pairs that host semi-final games) are guaranteed exclusive TV time slots on January 1, regardless of whether they will be hosting a semifinal game. Analysts expressed concerns that the semifinal games could face reduced television viewership due to the  New Year's Eve scheduling, believing that fans would not be accustomed to the scheduling, and that they would face competition from New Year's Eve events and television specials like New Year's Rockin' Eve, which is aired by ABC—a corporate sibling to CFP broadcaster ESPN. ESPN then proposed moving the semifinal games to January 2, 2016, a Saturday, arguing that the games would enjoy a higher level of prominence if held on a day of the week that is traditionally associated with college football. However, its proposal was rejected.

CFP commissioner Bill Hancock suggested this scheduling issue would instead "change the paradigm of what New Year's Eve is all about," opining that "if you're hosting a New Year's Eve party, you better have a bunch of televisions around." Ratings for the two semifinal games were down from the prior season's equivalents, with the Orange Bowl reaching a 9.7 rating (in comparison to 15.5 for the 2015 Rose Bowl) and the Cotton Bowl reaching a 9.9 rating (in comparison to a 15.3 rating for the 2015 Sugar Bowl). On the online WatchESPN streaming service, the Cotton Bowl and the Orange Bowl drew the second and third-largest streaming audiences in the service's history (excluding 2014 FIFA World Cup games), behind the 2015 College Football Playoff National Championship. As a result of the reduced viewership, it was reported that ESPN was negotiating $20 million worth of credits to advertisers to compensate for the lower than expected ratings.

Non-CFP bowl games
For the 2015–16 season, two new bowl games were added, the Cure Bowl and the Arizona Bowl, bringing the total number of bowl games to 41. Due to not having enough teams with a 6–6 or better record to fill available bowl slots, the increase in number of bowls had the adverse effect of allowing a record three teams with losing records (5–7) to participate in bowls. The teams were selected by being the ones with the highest Academic Progress Rate (APR) among all 5–7 teams. The participating teams with a losing record were Nebraska, Minnesota, and San Jose State.

+ Notre Dame is eligible for any one of the bowl bids reserved for ACC teams, if Notre Dame:  (a) is bowl-eligible; and (b) is not selected for one of the CFP Bowls.  Notre Dame may not be selected for one of the bowl games having ACC tie-ins unless Notre Dame has no less than one less overall loss than the winningest-remaining ACC team which has not yet been selected for a bowl game.

BYU has an agreement with the Royal Purple Las Vegas Bowl and the Hawaii Bowl for the 2015 and 2016 seasons. The Cougars will appear, in place of a Mountain West team, in the Las Vegas Bowl this season.

All-star games

FCS bowl game
The FCS has one bowl game; they also have a championship bracket that began on November 28 and ended on January 9.

Results
The Southeastern Conference was the Bowl Challenge Cup winner for the 2015-16 bowl season, which is awarded to the FBS football conference with the highest winning percentage. In addition, the nine total bowl wins by the SEC were the most ever accomplished by a single conference during a single bowl season. Southeastern Conference member Alabama won the 2016 College Football Playoff National Championship game to finish the year as consensus national champions for the 2015 football season.

Selection of the teams

CFP top 25 teams
On December 6, 2015, the College Football Playoff selection committee announced their final team rankings for the year:

Conference champions' bowl games
The Cotton Bowl Classic and Orange Bowl featured two conference champions playing against each other. Rankings are per the above CFP standings.

Bowl-eligible teams
ACC (9): Clemson, Duke, Florida State, Louisville, Miami, North Carolina, NC State, Pittsburgh, Virginia Tech
The American (8): Cincinnati, Connecticut, Houston, Memphis, Navy, South Florida, Temple, Tulsa
Big Ten (8): Indiana, Iowa, Michigan, Michigan State, Northwestern, Ohio State, Penn State, Wisconsin
Big 12 (7): Baylor, Kansas State, Oklahoma, Oklahoma State, TCU, Texas Tech, West Virginia
Conference USA (5): Louisiana Tech, Marshall, Middle Tennessee, Southern Miss, Western Kentucky
Independents (2): BYU, Notre Dame
MAC (7): Akron, Bowling Green, Central Michigan, Northern Illinois, Ohio, Toledo, Western Michigan
Mountain West (7): Air Force, Boise State, Colorado State, Nevada, New Mexico, San Diego State, Utah State 
Pac-12 (10): Arizona, Arizona State, California, Oregon,  Stanford, UCLA, USC, Utah, Washington, Washington State
SEC (10): Alabama, Arkansas, Auburn, Florida,  Georgia, LSU, Mississippi State, Ole Miss, Tennessee, Texas A&M
Sun Belt (4): Appalachian State, Arkansas State, Georgia Southern, Georgia State

Number of bowl berths available: 80 
Number of bowl-eligible teams: 77

Conditionally bowl-ineligible teams
The American (4): East Carolina*, SMU, Tulane, UCF
ACC (5): Boston College, Georgia Tech, Syracuse, Virginia, Wake Forest
Big Ten (6): Illinois*, Maryland,  Minnesota*, Nebraska*, Purdue, Rutgers
Big 12 (3): Iowa State, Kansas, Texas*
Conference USA (8): Charlotte, Florida Atlantic, FIU*, North Texas, Old Dominion*, Rice*, UTSA, UTEP*
Independent (1): Army
MAC (6): Ball State, Buffalo*, Eastern Michigan, Kent State, Miami (OH), UMass
Mountain West (5): Fresno State, Hawaii,  San Jose State*, UNLV, Wyoming
Pac-12 (2): Colorado, Oregon State 
SEC (4): Kentucky*, Missouri*, South Carolina, Vanderbilt
Sun Belt (7): Idaho, Louisiana–Lafayette, Louisiana-Monroe, New Mexico State, South Alabama*, Texas State, Troy

Number of bowl-ineligible teams: 51

Note: Being bowl-ineligible does not, in itself, exclude a team from the chance to play in a bowl game. Tiebreaker procedures based on a school's Academic Progress Rate (APR) allowed for the possibility of 5–7 teams to play in bowl games since not enough teams qualified to fill all 80 spots with at least a 6–6 record.

Note: Teams with Asterisk (*) have a 5–7 record (14 total). Since a maximum of 77 bowl slots were filled, 3 of these teams  qualified for a bowl game. These teams were Nebraska, Minnesota, and San Jose State. Missouri would have qualified over Minnesota or San Jose State, but announced they would decline a bowl bid.

Note: There are 128 teams in FBS.

See also
Celebration Bowl, a game between two FCS teams that played its inaugural game in 2015
Amos Alonzo Stagg Bowl, the championship game for Division III football that ended the 2015 NCAA Division III football season

Notes

References

Further reading